Vicky Veranita Yudhasoka Shu (born July 8, 1986) better known by her stage name Vicky Shu is an Indonesian singer who released her debut album, Drink Me, in 2011. Mari Bercinta 2 is a sequel to the same title song by Aura Kasih. The single was number 3 on Dahsyat and number 5 on Klik!. Shu is also designing high heels shoes product under her own brand, named Syu Syu. Before becoming a singer, she was a finalist for Miss Indonesia in 2007.

Study
Shu placed her priorities in her studies, although she had wanted to be in the entertainment since high school. Therefore, she completed her Undergraduate studies first in Political Science majoring in International Relations from Parahyangan Catholic University, Bandung, before she started in the entertainment industry. However, as yet she has yet to utilize her degree to work in the field that she studied.

Awards
 The Best Soloist Female Singer of Dahsyatnya Award 2013

References

Sources

External links
 

Indonesian fashion designers
21st-century Indonesian women singers
Indonesian people of Chinese descent
Women singer-songwriters
Indonesian guitarists
Banyumasan people
1987 births
Living people
Indonesian Muslims
21st-century guitarists
Shoe designers
Indonesian women fashion designers
Muslim fashion designers
21st-century women guitarists